Covan Lawrence (born 4 February 1980) is an Indian professional footballer who last played as a defender for Dempo in the I-League.

Career
Lawrence has, in the past, played for Salgaocar, Mahindra United, East Bengal, Air India, Vasco, and Dempo in the National Football League and the I-League.

Personal life
Covan is the younger brother of former India captain Climax Lawrence.

References

1980 births
Living people
Footballers from Goa
I-League players
Association football defenders
Indian footballers
Salgaocar FC players
Mahindra United FC players
East Bengal Club players
Air India FC players
Vasco SC
Dempo SC players